Alliata or Agliata is an Italian noble family.

History

The Alliata or Agliata family is among Italy's oldest noble families. The family claims an ancestor mentioned in an Imperial decretus of 325 AD, during the reign of Roman Emperor Constantine the Great. In 530 AD, Dacius Alliata became Archbishop of Milan. When Dacius Alliata died in 552, he was declared a saint by the Chalcedonian Church with a feast day on January 14.

In the 12th century, the family resettled at Pisa and then Palermo, where they accumulated several titles of Prince, including Prince of the Holy Roman Empire, the title of Gentiluomo di camera di Sua Santità, and numerous other titles.

In 1860, one Alfonzo Alliata led a failed mercenary force against Giuseppe Garibaldi's Expedition of the Thousand; Alliata was the sole survivor of his company.

References
 Elenco Ufficiale Nobiliare Italiano, Storia dell' aristocrazia italiana, L' impero da Giuliano a Costantino, Da Costantino a Carlo Magno: la stirpe imperiale europea.

External links
history of Sicilian Peerage